Mauno Jalmar Castrén (1931–2021) was a Finnish diplomat. He worked as a negotiating officer at the Ministry for Foreign Affairs and head of the Department of Trade Policy, Finland's Ambassador to Ankara in 1986–1991, Belgrade 1991–1992 and Sofia 1992–1994.

References

1931 births
2021 deaths
Ambassadors of Finland to Turkey
Ambassadors of Finland to Bulgaria
Ambassadors of Finland to Yugoslavia
People from Rovaniemi